The principle of double effect – also known as the rule of double effect; the doctrine of double effect, often abbreviated as DDE or PDE, double-effect reasoning; or simply double effect – is a set of ethical criteria which Christian philosophers have advocated for evaluating the permissibility of acting when one's otherwise legitimate act may also cause an effect one would otherwise be obliged to avoid. The first known example of double-effect reasoning is Thomas Aquinas' treatment of homicidal self-defense, in his work Summa Theologica.

This set of criteria states that an action having foreseen harmful effects practically inseparable from the good effect is justifiable if the following are true:
 the nature of the act is itself good, or at least morally neutral;
 the agent intends the good effect and does not intend the bad effect, either as a means to the good or as an end in itself;
 the good effect outweighs the bad effect in circumstances sufficiently grave to justify causing the bad effect and the agent exercises due diligence to minimize the harm.

Intentional harm vis-à-vis side effects
The principle of double effect is based on the idea that there is a morally relevant difference between an "intended" consequence of an act and one that is foreseen by the actor but not calculated to achieve their motive. So, for example, the principle is invoked to hold as ethically out of bounds the terror bombing of non-combatants having as its goal victory in a legitimate war, while holding as ethically in bounds an act of strategic bombing that similarly harms non-combatants with foresight  as a side effect of destroying a legitimate military target. Because advocates of double effect propose that consequentially similar acts can be morally different, double effect is most often criticized by consequentialists who consider the consequences of actions entirely determinative of the action's morality.

In their use of the distinction between intent and foresight without intent, advocates of double effect make three arguments. First, that intent differs from foresight, even in cases in which one foresees an effect as inevitable. Second, that one can apply the distinction to specific sets of cases found in military ethics (terror bombing/strategic bombing), medical ethics (craniotomy/hysterectomy), and social ethics (euthanasia). Third, that the distinction has moral relevance, importance, or significance.

The doctrine consists of four conditions that must be satisfied before an act is morally permissible:

 The nature-of-the-act condition. The action, apart from the foreseen evil, must be either morally good or indifferent.
 The means-end condition. The bad effect must not be the means by which one achieves the good effect. Good ends do not justify evil means.
 The right-intention condition. The intention must be the achieving of only the good effect, with the bad effect being only an unintended side effect.  All reasonable measures to avoid or mitigate the bad effect must be taken.
 The proportionality condition. There must be a proportionately grave reason for permitting the evil effect.

Criticisms

Consequentialists, in particular, reject the notion that two acts can differ in their moral permissibility if both have exactly the same consequences, or expected consequences. John Stuart Mill, a nineteenth-century advocate of the utilitarian version of consequentialism, argues that it is a mistake to confuse the standards for right action with a consideration of our motives to perform a right action: "He who saves a fellow creature from drowning does what is morally right, whether his motive be duty, or the hope of being paid for his trouble; he who betrays the friend that trusts him, is guilty of a crime, even if his object be to serve another friend to whom he is under greater obligations." According to Mill, scrutiny of motives will show that almost all good behavior proceeds from questionable intentions. Therefore, Mill argues, our moral analysis should ignore matters of motivation, and so we should reject DDE, which appeals to a distinction between intended and unintended consequences. Mill further claims that scrutiny of motives will reveal a man's character, but utilitarianism does not judge character, only the rightness or wrongness of actions.

See also

Trolley problem – a moral dilemma exploring the principle of double effect
Competing harms and necessity – similar theories in law
Lesser of two evils principle

References

External links 

Stanford Encyclopedia of Philosophy entry
PhilPapers Bibliography: 'Doctrine of Double Effect' 

Bioethics
Thomism
Ethical principles
Catholic Church and abortion